Petalidium coccineum is a species of a fast-growing shrub that bears red flowers and smooth, white bark. This shrub may grow up to 2.5 m in height. It is native to northwestern Namibia, particularly the dry savannah of Kaokoveld and Owamboland. Flowers occur in short racemes up to 40 mm long, borne in the leaf axils. Like other species in its genus, Petalidium coccineum bears hygroscopic fruit capsules which, when moist, release two flat seeds explosively.

Synonyms 
 Petalidium rubescens Oberm.
 Pseudobarleria coccinea (S.Moore) Lindau

References 
 PlantZAfrica.com entry
 Aluka entry
 Obermeyer, A.A. 1936. The South African species of Petalidium. Annals of the Transvaal Museum 18: 151-162.

coccineum
Creepers of South Africa
Plants described in 1880